White Tuft - the Little Beaver (French title: Mèche Blanche, les aventures du petit castor) is a family adventure film released February 22, 2008 in Canada and distributed by Alliance Atlantis. The film is directed by Philippe Calderon. The film follows the adventures of a small beaver called White Tuft.

Reception 
The Vancouver Sun gave White Tuft - the Little Beaver three and a half stars. Katherine Monk said that it was "crafted in the same tradition as The Bear, Born Free and March of the Penguins".

References

External links
Trailer

2008 films
Canadian children's adventure films
2000s Canadian films